Regional Media-Virden Broadcasting headquartered in Davenport, Iowa is private owner of radio stations in the Midwest.

The company traces it founding  to Randal J. Miller who at the age of 16 in 1971 started a 100 milliwatt transmitter station with a 300-foot range from his parents house in rural Shelbyville, Illinois.  In 1982 he launched 3,000 watt easy listening music station WRVI with a range of 25 miles in Virden, Illinois.  He sold the station in 1992 and acquired other small market stations in Illinois and sold the then Taylorville, Illinois based  Virden Broadcasting to Fletcher M. Ford in 2013 who moved the headquarters to Davenport.  Ford of Blue Grass, Iowa at the time  was sales manager of Virden's Kewanee radio stations.

The Virden name frequently has been clipped to just Regional Media since Ford's acquisition.  In December 2021, the company expanded outside of Illinois radio station base with the acquisition of KVVL and KNIM in Maryville, Missouri.  The company's web reginonalmedia.info

Stations

Illinois
KQCJ FM, Cambridge, Illinois
WKEI AM, Kewanee, Illinois
WJRE FM, Galva, Illinois
WZOE-FM, Princeton, Illinois
WZOE (AM), Princeton, Illinois
WRVY FM, Henry, Illinois
WZZT FM, Morrison, Illinois
WSSQ FM, Sterling, Illinois
WSDR AM, Sterling, Illinois
WLMD (FM), Bushnell, Illinois
WJEQ FM, Macomb, Illinois
WKAI FM, Macomb, Illinois
WNLF FM, Macomb, Illinois
WMQZ FM, Colchester, Illinois

Missouri
KVVL FM, Maryville
KNIM AM, Maryville

External links
  (as of January 16, 2022 redirects to a subsection the company's illinoisnewsnow.com website)

References

Davenport, Iowa
Mass media companies of the United States
Communications in Iowa
Companies based in the Quad Cities